The 2010 All-Ireland Minor Football Championship (known for sponsorship reasons as the ESB Minor Football Championship) is the premier "knockout" competition for under-18 competitors of the game of Gaelic football played in Ireland. The series of games are organised by the Gaelic Athletic Association and are played during the summer months with the All-Ireland Minor Football Final being played on the third Sunday in September 2010 in Croke Park, Dublin.

Leinster Minor Football Championship

First round

Second Round - Losers Section

Third round

Dublin advanced directly to the quarter finals

Quarter-finals

Semi-finals

Final

All Leinster Championship results taken from Leinster GAA and Cork GAA archived pages.

Connacht Minor Football Championship

Quarter-finals

Semi-finals

Final

Munster Minor Football Championship

Quarter-finals

Play-offs

Semi-finals

Final

All Munster Championship results taken from

Ulster Minor Football Championship

First round

Quarter-finals

Semi-finals

Final

All-Ireland Series

Quarter-finals

Semi-finals

Final

External links
Leinster Fixtures
Munster Fixtures

All-Ireland Minor Football Championship
All-Ireland Minor Football Championship